Enrique Domingo Cadícamo (Luján, Buenos Aires province, July 15, 1900 – Buenos Aires, December 3, 1999) was a prolific Argentine tango lyricist, poet and novelist. From an initial Symbolist bent, he developed a distinctive, lunfardo-rich style from an early age, and by 1925 he had his first piece, Pompas de jabón, sung by Carlos Gardel. Other notable compositions include Madame Ivonne, Che, papusa, oí, Anclado en París, Muñeca brava, Al Mundo le falta un Tornillo, Pa' que bailen los muchachos and Los mareados ("The dizzy ones"), originally titled Los dopados ("The doped ones"), about a couple that vows to get drunk after realizing their love is over.

Career
Also prolific as a writer, he published three volumes of lyrical poetry (Canciones grises, 1926; La luna del bajo fondo, 1940; and Viento que lleva y trae, 1945), three biographical and historical books (El debut de Gardel en París, La historia del tango en París and Mis memorias), some theatrical works (La epopeya del tango and La baba del diablo, both co-written with Félix Pelayo, and El romance de dos vagos in collaboration with Germán Ziclis) and the narrative pieces El cantor de Buenos Aires, with Alberto Ballerini, and Los cuentos de un príncipe with Martín Lemos. In 1936 he wrote and directed the film Noites Cariocas.

As a recognition to his career, he was declared Illustrious Citizen of the city of Buenos Aires in 1987, and Emeritus of Argentine Culture in 1996. He died at 99 from heart failure.

Los mareados has enjoyed several revivals; it has been part of Mercedes Sosa's repertoire since the 1980s, and was also covered by Roberto Goyeneche and Andrés Calamaro.

Another Cadícamo lyric, Por la vuelta ("[A toast] to [our] return") is a mirror image of Los mareados: two former lovers meet a year after splitting up, find that their mutual friendship has survived their estrangement, and agree to drink to that. Incidentally, the drink of choice in both stories is champagne.

Works

Books 
 Canciones Tristes
 La Luna del Bajo Fondo
 Viento que Lleva y Trae
 "Historia del Tango en París
 El otro Juan Carlos Cobián
 Bajo el Signo del Tango

Theatre
 Así nos Paga la Vida
 La Baba del Diablo
 El Romance de Dos Vagos
 El Cantor de Buenos Aires
 La Epopeya del Tango

Tangos
 Los mareados 
 Por la vuelta
 Nostalgias
 Pompas de Jabón
 Muñeca Brava
 Vieja Recova
 ¡Che, papusa... Oí!
 Madame Ivonne
 Nunca tuvo novio
 Notas de bandoneón
 " El canto de Buenos Aires"
 " La casita de mis viejos"

Films 
The life of Carlos Gardel

Producer Martin Deluca scrimplay by

Enrique Cadicamo 
 Passport to Rio (1948)

External links
Biography
Cadícamo life work 
 Gardel 2008 film original screenplay by Enrique Cadicamo& Martin Deluca Adaptation & translation English by Martin Deluca

1900 births
1999 deaths
Argentine film directors
Tango poets
Argentine people of Calabrian descent
Argentine people of Italian descent
People from Luján, Buenos Aires
Burials at La Chacarita Cemetery
20th-century poets
Tango lyricists
20th-century Argentine male writers